Unheimliche Geschichten  ( Uncanny Stories), titled Eerie Tales in English, is a 1919 German silent anthology film directed by Richard Oswald and starring Conrad Veidt. The film is split into five stories: The Apparition, The Hand, The Black Cat (based on the Edgar Allan Poe short story), The Suicide Club (based on the Robert Louis Stevenson short story) and Der Spuk (The Spectre).

A remake, also directed by Oswald, was released in 1932.

Plot
At midnight in a closed antiquarian bookshop, three figures – Death, the Devil and the Harlot – step out of paintings and read five macabre stories. The first story is The Apparition, about a man (Veidt) and a woman (Berber) who check into a hotel. When the woman vanishes, everyone there denies she ever existed. It is later revealed that she died of the plague and the hotel management wanted to cover it up. The second story is called The Hand, about two men (Veidt and Schunzel) who compete over a woman they desire. The loser kills his opponent, which leads to the victim's ghostly hand avenging itself on his murderer. The third story is The Black Cat, about a drunk (Schunzel) who murders his wife (Berber) and walls up her body in his cellar. The family cat reveals his murderous secret to the police. The fourth story is The Suicide Club, about a detective who discovers a secret society only to be chosen as their next victim via a card game. The final story called The Spectre is about a braggart baron (Veidt) who encourages his wife (Berber) to have an affair with a total stranger. With the completion of the fifth tale, the clock in the shop strikes one and the three ghostly storytellers retreat back into their paintings.

Cast
 Anita Berber as Harlot
 Reinhold Schünzel as the Devil
 Conrad Veidt as Death
 Hugo Döblin	
 Paul Morgan	
 Georg John	
 Bernhard Goetzke

Production
Unheimliche Geschichten was directed, produced and co-written by Richard Oswald. The film stars Anita Berber, Reinhold Schünzel and Conrad Veidt as the Harlot, the Devil and Death in the opening sequence, but they also play various other roles in each of the five stories. Each story was based on an author's work, including  Anselm Heine (The Apparition, 1912), Robert Liebmann (The Hand), Edgar Allan Poe (The Black Cat, 1843), Robert Louis Stevenson ("The Suicide Club", 1878) and Richard Oswald's own contribution (Der Spuk/ The Spectre).

Release
Unheimliche Geschichten was first shown in Berlin on November 5, 1919. In the book Directory of World Cinema: Germany, Volume 10 Katharina Loew described the film as the "critical link between the more conventional German mystery and detective films of the mid 1910s and the groundbreaking fantastic cinema of the early 1920s".  The film is sometimes referred to in reference works as Weird Tales, Eerie Tales, Five Sinister Stories or Tales of the Uncanny.

Reception
From contemporary reviews in Germany, the Berliner Tageblatt praised the acting of Conrad Veidt, the lighting and that the film was effective without having a cast of thousands. The review commented that the pace of the film did stagger at times. Der Kinematograph, also praised Veidt and Oswalds' mastery of film.

From retrospective reviews, Loew has stated that the film did not age well, specifically pointing out the acting which would strike "today's viewers as rather labored." Loew also critiqued the interiors of the film as "unconvincing and ramshackle" and the episodes of the film were uneven.

Troy Howarth comments "The film set something of a standard for subsequent German anthologies, including Fritz Lang's Destiny and Paul Leni's Waxworks.....its tone vacilates clumsily between the macabre and the farcical....". He also comments there are too many stories occupying the running time, saying "its abundance of stories and lack of screen time ultimately work against each other.....Only Conrad Veidt makes much of an impression. He constantly rises above the mediocre quality of the rest of the picture."

References

Sources

External links
 
 

German silent feature films
1919 horror films
Films of the Weimar Republic
Films directed by Richard Oswald
Films based on The Black Cat
Films based on works by Robert Louis Stevenson
German horror anthology films
German black-and-white films
Films based on multiple works
Films about animals
Films about cats
Silent horror films
1910s German films
1910s German-language films